Sir William Basil Goulding (4 November 1909 – 16 January 1982) was an Irish art collector, cricketer, squash player and prominent businessman.

Personal life

Sir Basil Goulding was born in Dublin, Ireland, and was educated at Winchester College, and Christ Church, Oxford. He had ambitions of architecture, but instead inherited the family business W&HM Goulding Ltd and succeeded his father as chairperson in 1935. Additionally, Goulding was an adept businessman and sat on the boards of many companies.

Sir Basil Goulding was an important art collector of contemporary art in Ireland and was renowned for his extensive collection which was dispersed posthumously. He championed up and coming artists, and held some impressive names in his collection. Additionally, he created some important corporate commission opportunities for emerging artists.

In 1939 he married Valerie Goulding having met at the Fairyhouse Races. She was an Irish campaigner for people with disabilities, the founder of the Central Remedial Clinic in Dublin and senator. Together, they had three sons, Hamilton, Timothy and Lingard. The family lived in Enniskerry, County Wicklow in a property with extensive gardens. Sir Basil Goulding had a keen interest in gardening. The family home was also the location where Sir Basil Goulding had the notable 'Goulding Summer House' built by Scott Tallon Walker architects.

During World War II, Goulding was commissioned as a pilot officer in the Royal Air Force. By the end of 1942 he had reached the rank of wing commander.

Lady Valerie's father, Sir Walter Monckton was a lawyer, and was the UK Attorney General during the Edward VIII abdication crisis, later serving as a British Member of Parliament for Bristol West, serving as defence minister and Paymaster-General. He also played cricket, and played one first-class match for a combined Oxford/Cambridge University team. He was later president of the MCC in 1956.

Sir Basil's uncle was chairman of Rolls-Royce.

Contributions to Irish Public life

The Arts Council
The Arts Act of 1951 established the Arts Council in response to the Bodkin Report which outlined the sad condition of the arts in Ireland. Sir Basil Goulding was a co-opted member of the council from its formative years and was instrumental in acting on many of its policies.

Contemporary Irish Art Society

Goulding was the founding Chairperson of the Contemporary Irish Art Society in 1962, along with Gordon Lambert, Cecil King, Stanley Mosse, James White and Michael Scott. The enthusiasm and vision of these founding members of the society was the catalyst which led to the development of many important art collections in Ireland. The purpose of the society was to encourage a greater level of patronage of living Irish artists which, at the time, was extremely low. This was mainly achieved by raising funds to purchase artworks by living artists, which were then donated to public collections. The first purchase in 1962 was an important painting by Patrick Scott, donated to the Hugh Lane Municipal Gallery of Modern Art. Over the following 12 years the society purchased 37 works for the Hugh Lane Municipal Gallery, until in 1974, Dublin Corporation started to provide an annual purchasing fund for the gallery.

Kilkenny Design Workshops

Following completion of the report 'Design in Ireland', the Kilkenny Design Workshops (KDW) was set up in 1963. It primarily endeavoured to nurture native Irish crafts particularly textiles, metalwork, ceramics, glass and furniture to have a modern yet distinctly Irish sensibility. The KDW was the first State sponsored design agency in the world and was held as a model of governmental intervention in design. Sir Basil Goulding sat on the board of the KDW from its origination and fulfilled the role of chairperson from 1977 until 1981.

Championing Art

Collecting Irish artists

Sir Basil Goudling was deeply involved in the arts as a collector, sponsor, and benefactor. He carefully and thoughtfully collected pieces of art, and amassed a large and important collection which showcased much of the work being produced in Ireland at the time. He bought paintings and sculptures by many notable creatives such as Jack Butler Yeats, Patrick Scott (artist). He particularly championed the work of Barrie Cooke and Camille Souter and owned many of their works.

Commissioning Irish artists

Sir Basil Goulding used his influence as a successful businessman to create opportunities for artists to complete corporate commissions. In 1967 he commissioned Michael Farrell to create murals for the National Bank of Ireland, College Green during his time as director of the bank. In the unveiling of the artwork, Sir Basil said "It is known that a Bank means all things to all men, but to the best of my knowledge this is a rare occasion in that the Bank is here acting as patron." 

In 1969 he commissioned artworks for Fitzwilton House by Irish and British artists, Robert Ballagh, Barrie Cooke, Anne Madden and Michael Farrell – some of which have since been transferred to the Trinity College Dublin Art Collection.

Sport

Cricket

A right-handed batsman and wicket-keeper, he played twice for the Ireland cricket team against the MCC in 1934, the year in which his father was president of the Irish Cricket Union. He made his debut in July in a two-day match, scoring seven runs in the Ireland second innings and taking one catch in the MCC first innings. The following month, he played his only first-class match, not scoring in either innings.

Other Sport

In addition to playing cricket, he also represented Ireland at squash, and captained Oxford University at football. He was also a keen skier and continued to ski until near the end of his life.

Professional Life

W & HM Goulding Ltd.
W & HM Goulding Ltd. was a well established fertiliser manufacturer in the 19th and 20th centuries in Ireland. 
 Sir Basil Goudling inherited the family business W & HM Goulding Ltd and succeeded his father as chairperson in 1935. W & HM Goulding Ltd. was a large fertiliser business based in Dublin and Cork.

In the 1850s W. and H.M. Goulding built a large factory in The Glen that was used to make phosphate fertilizers and the area became known as Goulding's Glen.[4] The factory closed and was demolished in the mid-20th century and very little of it remains today. The land was donated to the people of Cork by Sir Basil Goulding in the late 1960s and was subsequently developed as an amenity park.

W. and H.M. Goulding also had premises in Dublin City. In 1962, a production facility in East Wall known as 'East Wall. Sulphac Ltd.' was opened and was jointly owned by W. and H.M. Goulding Ltd. and Freeport Sulpher Company of New York. As well as notably, their office building: Fitzwilton House which was commissioned by Sir Basil Goulding to a design by English architects, Shoolheifer & Burley and completed in 1969. It was a bold expression of modernist architecture with a complex layered façade incorporating at least five different concrete finishes forming a dramatic backdrop to Dublin's Grand Canal. The building was demolished in 2018.

Other Business
His other directorships included the Bank of Ireland, Hibernian Insurance Co., Rio Tinto Zinc, Irish Times Ltd, Independent Newspapers, Irish Pensions Trust, Johnston Mooney and O'Brien, Massey Waterford Ltd, Irish Metal Industries. https://www.dib.ie/biography/goulding-sir-william-basil-a9300

References

1909 births
1982 deaths
Alumni of Christ Church, Oxford
Sportspeople from Dublin (city)
Cricketers from Dublin (city)
Irish male squash players
Oxford University A.F.C. players
Royal Air Force officers
Royal Air Force personnel of World War II
Businesspeople from Dublin (city)
People educated at Winchester College
Baronets in the Baronetage of the United Kingdom
Association footballers not categorized by position
English footballers
Wicket-keepers
Irish cricketers